The name Beryl has been used for seven tropical cyclones in the Atlantic Ocean and for one in the South-West Indian Ocean.

In the Atlantic:
Tropical Storm Beryl (1982), passed just south of Brava Island, Cape Verde and dissipated north of the Windward Islands.
Tropical Storm Beryl (1988), formed over Lake Pontchartrain, Louisiana and drifted into the Gulf of Mexico before making landfall at New Orleans.
Tropical Storm Beryl (1994), a short-lived storm that made landfall at Panama City, Florida, and caused severe fooding in several states along the East Coast of the United States.
Tropical Storm Beryl (2000), developed in the Bay of Campeche and made landfall just south of the United States–Mexico border.
Tropical Storm Beryl (2006), made landfall on Nantucket, Massachusetts.
Tropical Storm Beryl (2012), made landfall near Jacksonville Beach, Florida. 
Hurricane Beryl (2018), a Category 1 hurricane which dissipated before approaching the Lesser Antilles; later briefly regenerated into a subtropical storm to the north of Bermuda.

In the South-West Indian:
 Cyclone Beryl (1961)

Atlantic hurricane set index articles
South-West Indian Ocean cyclone set index articles